Receiving Transmission is the second and final studio album by Australian punk rock band One Dollar Short. It was released in July 2004 and peaked at number 55 on the ARIA Charts.

Track listing 
Standard tracklist
 "Some Assembly Required"	
 "Mayakovsky Had a Gun"	
 "Headlights"	
 "Seven Colours"	
 "Note to Self..."	
 "Broken/Fixed"	
 "Taste of Romance"	
 "Astronauts Journal"	
 "Engines Failed"	
 "Goodbye (Is Not Enough)"	
 "We Are Not Science"

The B Sides Bonus Disc
 "Untitled"	
 "Silver Spoons"	
 "Here I Am"	
 "Keepsake"	
 "Tim's Brother"	
 "Friend"	
 "Not Pretty Enough" (Kasey Chambers)
 "After the Fire"	
 "Starry Night"	
 "A Measure of Stride"
 "Robot"

 Tracks "Silver Spoons" & "Not Pretty Enough" from the "10 Years" single (2002).
 Tracks "Here I Am" & "Robot" from the Press and Hold EP (2001).
 Tracks "Untitled", "Keepsake", "After the Fire" & "A Measure of Stride" from the "Keepsake" single (2003).
 Tracks "Tim's Brother" & "Starry Night" from the Board Game EP (2001).
 Track "Friend" from the "Is This the Part?" single (2002).

Charts

Release history

References

2004 albums
Mushroom Records albums
One Dollar Short albums